Jorge Federico de la Vega Membrillo (born 23 April 1959) is a Mexican politician affiliated with the PRD. He currently serves as Deputy of the LXII Legislature of the Mexican Congress representing the State of Mexico.

References

1959 births
Living people
Politicians from the State of Mexico
Members of the Chamber of Deputies (Mexico)
Party of the Democratic Revolution politicians
21st-century Mexican politicians
Deputies of the LXII Legislature of Mexico